Debbie Whitmont is an Australian television journalist.

In 1989 Whitmont began her work at ABC as a researcher. She then spent three years in commercial television, working for Channel 10. Whitmont then returned to Four Corners as a reporter, producer and later associate producer. From 1993 to 1996 Whitmont was a Middle East correspondent for ABC and filed reports from Iran, Iraq, Syria, Lebanon, Egypt and Pakistan for Lateline, Foreign Correspondent, and The 7.30 Report. In 1998 she returned to report for Four Corners.

Sources
 The Women's Pages: Australian Women and Journalism since 1850, Australian Women's Archives Project, 2008

External links
Four Corners

Australian television journalists
Australian television personalities
Women television personalities
Australian television producers
Australian women television producers
Year of birth missing (living people)
Living people
Place of birth missing (living people)
Australian women television journalists